Les bricoleurs (The Handymen) is a 1963 French thriller film directed by Jean Girault and starring Francis Blanche, Darry Cowl, Elke Sommer and Jacqueline Maillan. It was released as Who Stole the Body? in the United States.

Premise 
Two estate agents discover a body in a house they are about to sell to a customer.

Cast 
Francis Blanche : Edouard 
Darry Cowl : Félix
Jacqueline Maillan : L'anglaise 
Clément Harari : Le professeur Hippolyte
Elke Sommer : Brigitte 
Daniel Ceccaldi : La Banque Hubert
Claudine Coster : Ingrid 
Mario David : Georges, l'ami de Monica
Valérie Lagrange : Monica 
Rolande Ségur : Princess Elisabeth
Bernard Dhéran : inspector de l'auto-école 
Daniel Emilfork  : Igor, le domestique du professeur Hippolyte
Serge Marquand : Le chasseur du professeur 
Paul Mercey  : Le curé 
André Badin : Ludovic, le chauffeur de l'Anglaise 
Yves Barsacq  : Le maître d'hôtel de La Banque
Roger Carel : Le comte de La Bigle 
Philippe Castelli : Le facteur 
Marcel Pérès : Le garde-chasse 
Jacques Seiler  : Le majordome du comte
Jean Tissier : Le professeur Gédéon Depois-Demesure
Gisèle Sandre : La dernière victime
France Anglade : Une jeune femme passant son permis
Christian Méry : Un homme passant son permis
Ski Hi Lee : Le voleur de la banque

References

External links 

1963 films
French thriller films
1960s French-language films
1960s thriller films
Films directed by Jean Girault
1960s French films